Geneviève Cluny (born 18 April 1928) is a former French film actress. She appeared in both French New Wave films as well as popular mainstream commercial productions during the 1950s and 1960s. She is credited for the basic idea on which Jean-Luc Godard's A Woman Is a Woman was based.

Selected filmography
 Les Cousins (1959)
 The Love Game (1960)
 The Joker (1960)
 The Merry Widow (1962)
 If You Go Swimming in Tenerife (1964)
 Agent 505: Death Trap in Beirut (1965)
 House of Cards (1968)

References

Bibliography
 Marie, Michel. The French New Wave: An Artistic School. John Wiley & Sons, 2008.

External links

1928 births
Living people
French film actresses
People from Deux-Sèvres
Signatories of the 1971 Manifesto of the 343